"U & Me" is a song by Italian Eurodance group Cappella, released on 6 June 1994 via Axis Records and Red Bullet labels as the sixth single from their second studio album, U Got 2 Know (1994). Co-written and produced by Gianfranco Bortolotti, it features vocals by Vikki Sheperd, sampled from her song "Love Has Changed My Mind". The single experienced success in many European countries, particularly in Finland, where it peaked at number one for two weeks. It was also a top-10 hit in Italy, the Netherlands, and the UK.

Critical reception
In his weekly UK chart commentary, James Masterton wrote, "The new hit is more of the same, Italian dance which will probably find as much favour and annoy as many people as the last one." Pan-European magazine Music & Media noted that "a synth buzzes like a swarm of bees approaching with queen bee singer Kelly ahead of it. The sting of this Euro dance song is of course the catchy melody line and the simple yell." Alan Jones from Music Week gave it four out of five, saying, "Less distinctive than recent Cappella outings, this actually resembles Maxx's "Get-A-Way", with similar synth scoring and a passable rap. But since that record is top five and Cappella have had three consecutive Top 10 hits, it is not hard to see where this is going." James Hamilton from the RM Dance Update declared it as a "'you and me forever' girls prodded surging cheesy Italo hip house galloper".

Chart performance
"U & Me" peaked at number one in Finland for two weeks and topped the Music & Media European Dance Radio Chart for five weeks. The single entered the top 10 in Italy (6), the Netherlands (3), and the UK, as well as on the Eurochart Hot 100, where it entered on 25 June 1994 and peaked at number seven on 9 July. In the UK, "U & Me" reached number 10 during its third week on the UK Singles Chart, on 26 June, and it also reached number 10 on the UK Dance Singles Chart. Additionally, it was a top-20 hit in Austria (15), Belgium (14), Denmark (15), Germany (14), Sweden (15), and Switzerland (13). Outside Europe, it charted in Australia, where it peaked at number 76.

Airplay
The song entered the European airplay chart Border Breakers at number 16 on 18 June due to crossover airplay in West Central-, Northwest-, North- and Northeast-Europe, and peaked at the fifth position on 16 July.

Music video
The accompanying music video for "U & Me" was directed by Juan Kerr and was A-listed on Germany's VIVA in July 1994.

Track listing
 "U & Me" (Masters radio edit) – 3:17
 "U & Me" (Mars Plastic mix) – 6:36
 "U & Me" (Housemix) – 6:47
 "U & Me" (R.A.F. Zone mix) – 5:42
 "U & Me" (DJ EFX's Disco Latino Mezcla) – 7:32
 "U & Me" (X-Ray cut) – 6:17
 "U & Me" (Plus Staples extended) – 7:14
 "U & Me" (B's San Transdisko Dish) – 7:05

Credits
 Artwork – TFX Image Development BV
 Mastered by – Hay Zeelen
 Producer – Gianfranco Bortolotti
 Written by – C. Piccinelli, Diego Leoni, Gianfranco Bortolotti, G. Elmzoom, L. Cittadini, Ricardo Overman

Charts

Weekly charts

Year-end charts

References

External links
 

1994 singles
1994 songs
Cappella (band) songs
Number-one singles in Finland
Songs written by Gianfranco Bortolotti